Viktor Damceski (born 5 September 1996) is a Macedonian handball player who plays for RK Tineks Prolet.

References
http://www.eurohandball.com/ec/chc/men/2015-16/player/565516/Damceski+Viktor
http://makrakomet.com/viktor-damceski-son-mi-e-da-zaigram-za-barselona/
http://ekipa.mk/tineks-prolet-potpisha-profesionalni-dogovori-so-chetvoritsa-mladi-rakometari/

1996 births
Living people
Macedonian male handball players
Sportspeople from Skopje